Lyudmila Aleksandrovna Kostyukevich (born 8 July 1964) is a Belarusian former speed skater. She competed in two events at the 1998 Winter Olympics.

References

External links
 

1964 births
Living people
Belarusian female speed skaters
Olympic speed skaters of Belarus
Speed skaters at the 1998 Winter Olympics
Place of birth missing (living people)